Philip Michael Wolfson (born 1958) is an American artist who worked as head of design for architect Zaha Hadid and now has his own studio.

Early life and education
He studied architecture at Cornell University and the Architectural Association, London. He then worked with architect Zaha Hadid for 10 years, becoming her head of design. He founded his own studio in 1991.

Career
Wolfson is influenced stylistically by constructivism and futurism. He uses wood, glass, metal and stone, as well as new materials, such as carbon fiber, in his designs. Works by Wolfson have been shown at, or are included in numerous international collections including the Victoria and Albert Museum (London. UK), the Foundation Cartier (Paris, FR), and the Price Tower Arts Center (Bartlesville, US). His designs are on display at international galleries (Contrasts, Shanghai; Franziska Kessler, Zurich; Sebastian + Barquet, New York) and at international art fairs (Art Basel, Design Miami, Milan Furniture Fair, Milan, TEFAF, Maastricht).

He designed furniture pieces for the Robert restaurant at New York's Museum of Arts and Design.

References

External links
 Philip Michael Wolfson at Covent Garden Super Design
 Wolfson Design, his studio

1958 births
American furniture designers
Artists from Philadelphia
Living people